The 156th Infantry was an infantry regiment of the British Indian Army.  It was formed in Mesopotamia in May 1918 during the First World War.  It moved to India in June where it remained until disbanded in 1919.

Background
Heavy losses suffered by the British Expeditionary Force on the Western Front following the German spring offensive in March 1918 resulted in a major reorganization of the Egyptian Expeditionary Force:
 two divisions52nd (Lowland) and 74th (Yeomanry) were transferred to France in April; they were replaced by the 3rd (Lahore) and 7th (Meerut) Divisions from Mesopotamia;
 nine yeomanry regiments were dismounted, converted to machine gunners and sent to France at the end of the same month; the 4th and 5th Cavalry Divisions were reformed with Indian cavalry regiments withdrawn from France and the 15th (Imperial Service) Cavalry Brigade already in Egypt;
 the 10th (Irish), 53rd (Welsh), 60th (2/2nd London), and 75th Divisions were reduced to a single British battalion per brigade.  They were reformed with nine Indian infantry battalions and an Indian pioneer battalion each.
In fact, the 75th Division already had four Indian battalions assigned, so of the 36 battalions needed to reform the divisions, 22 were improvised by taking whole companies from existing units already on active service in Mesopotamia and Palestine to form the 150th Infantry (3 battalions), 151st Sikh Infantry (3), 152nd Punjabis (3), 153rd Punjabis (3), 154th Infantry (3), 155th Pioneers (2), 156th Infantry (1) and the 11th Gurkha Rifles (4).  The donor units were then brought back up to strength by drafts.  In the event, just 13 of the battalions were assigned to the divisions and the remaining nine were transferred from Mesopotamia to India in June 1918.

History
The regiment was formed with a single battalion (1st Battalion) in Mesopotamia in May 1918 by the transfer of complete companies from:
73rd Carnatic Infantry
79th Carnatic Infantry
80th Carnatic Infantry
83rd Wallajahbad Light Infantry
The battalion was transferred from Mesopotamia to India in June 1918 and joined the Karachi Brigade where it remained in until the end of the First World War.  The 156th Infantry was disbanded in 1919.

See also

 Indian Army during World War I

Notes

References

Bibliography

External links
 

British Indian Army infantry regiments
Military units and formations established in 1918
Military units and formations disestablished in 1919